From the Ground Up is a 1921 American comedy silent black and white film directed by E. Mason Hopper and based on the short story by Rupert Hughes.

Cast
 Tom Moore as Terence Giluley
 Helene Chadwick as Philena Mortimer
 DeWitt Jennings as Mr. Mortimer
 Grace Pike as Mrs. Mortimer
 Hardee Kirkland as Carswell Sr
 Darrell Foss as Carswell Jr

References

External links

 

Films directed by E. Mason Hopper
Films based on works by Rupert Hughes
Silent American comedy films
1921 comedy films
1921 films
American black-and-white films
Goldwyn Pictures films
1920s American films